Avşar (also, Uzeirkend and Üzejirkənd) is a village and municipality in the Aghjabadi Rayon of Azerbaijan.  It has a population of 5,600.
Ehali 1.

Notable natives 

 Namig Abdullayev, a national hero of Azerbaijan.

References 

Populated places in Aghjabadi District